
Gmina Domaniewice is a rural gmina (administrative district) in Łowicz County, Łódź Voivodeship, in central Poland.

Villages
Gmina Domaniewice contains the villages and settlements of Domaniewice, Krępa, Lisiewice Duże, Lisiewice Małe, Reczyce, Rogóźno, Sapy, Skaratki, Skaratki pod Las, Skaratki pod Rogóźno, Stroniewice and Strzebieszew.

Neighbouring gminas
Gmina Domaniewice is bordered by the gminas of Bielawy, Głowno, Łowicz and Łyszkowice.

References
Polish official population figures 2006

Domaniewice
Łowicz County